Kistolmacs is a resort village in Hungary.

The village is located in a wooded valley. There is a lake with a beach: The lake is regularly stocked with fish.  The village has snack bars and a restaurant.  A supermarket is located nearby A narrow gauge railway network, connects Kistolmacs to neighbouring villages.

Populated places in Zala County